This is a list of films which have placed number one at the weekly box office in France during 1993. Amounts are in French franc.

References

See also
 List of French films of 1993
 Lists of box office number-one films

1993
France
1993 in French cinema